Anna Karolína Schmiedlová was the defending champion, but lost in the first round to Aliaksandra Sasnovich.

Simona Halep won the title for the second time, defeating Anastasija Sevastova in the final, 6–0, 6–0. This was only the ninth WTA singles final in history to be won with a 6–0, 6–0 (a "double bagel") scoreline, and the first since Agnieszka Radwańska won the 2013 Sydney International.

Seeds

Draw

Finals

Top half

Bottom half

Qualifying

Seeds

Qualifiers

Lucky loser
  Xu Shilin

Draw

First qualifier

Second qualifier

Third qualifier

Fourth qualifier

References
Main Draw
Qualifying Draw

BRD Bucharest Openandnbsp;- Singles
2016 Singles